Audrey Jean Garland, later Wray (December 24, 1912 – February 4, 1969), was a Canadian pair skater.  With partner Fraser Sweatman, she won the silver medal at the Canadian Figure Skating Championships in 1935 and competed in the 1936 Winter Olympics.

Results
Pairs (with Sweatman)

References

1912 births
1969 deaths
Canadian female pair skaters
Figure skaters at the 1936 Winter Olympics
Olympic figure skaters of Canada